Critchett is a surname. Notable people with the surname include:

 Anderson Critchett (1845–1925), British eye surgeon
 Belle Christie Critchett ( 1868–1956), American suffragist and activist
 Critchett baronets
 George Critchett (disambiguation), multiple people
 Mary Critchett (died 1729), English pirate and convict